Taika may refer to:

Taika (era) (大化), Japanese era name for years spanning 645 through 650
Taika Reform (大化の改新, Taika no Kaishin), a major reform promulgated during the Taika era

People
Taika Waititi, New Zealand filmmaker